Daramru (also Romanized as Dārāmrū; also known as Daramrud (Persian: دارامرود), also Romanized as Dārāmrūd) is a village in Kakavand-e Sharqi Rural District, Kakavand District, Delfan County, Lorestan Province, Iran. At the 2006 census, its population was 139, in 31 families.

References 

Towns and villages in Delfan County